For a Friend (Pro kamaráda) is a 1940 Czechoslovak drama film, directed by Miroslav Cikán. It stars  Theodor Pistek, Ladislav Boháč, and Jaroslav Vojta.

References

External links
For a Friend at the Internet Movie Database

1940 films
Czechoslovak drama films
1940 drama films
Films directed by Miroslav Cikán
Czechoslovak black-and-white films
1940s Czech films